Paul McKay (born c. 1947) was a Canadian football player who played for the Hamilton Tiger-Cats and Calgary Stampeders. He won the Grey Cup with Hamilton in 1972. He played college football at the University of Toronto.

References

1940s births
Living people
Hamilton Tiger-Cats players
Calgary Stampeders players
Canadian football defensive backs
Toronto Varsity Blues football players